The 35th Cannes Film Festival was held from 14 to 26 May 1982. The Palme d'Or was jointly awarded to Missing by Costa Gavras and Yol by Şerif Gören and Yılmaz Güney.

The festival opened with the 1916 film Intolerance, directed by D. W. Griffith and closed with E.T. the Extra-Terrestrial, directed by Steven Spielberg.

Jury 
The following people were appointed as the Jury of the 1982 film competition:

Feature films
Giorgio Strehler (Italy) Jury President
Jean-Jacques Annaud (France)
Suso Cecchi d'Amico (Italy)
Geraldine Chaplin (USA)
Gabriel García Márquez (Colombia)
Florian Hopf (West Germany)
Sidney Lumet (USA)
Mrinal Sen (India)
Claude Soule (France) (CST official)
René Thévenet (France)

Official selection

In competition - Feature film
The following feature films competed for the Palme d'Or:

À toute allure by Robert Kramer
Another Way (Egymásra nézve) by Károly Makk
Britannia Hospital by Lindsay Anderson
Cecilia by Humberto Solás
Day of the Idiots (Tag der Idioten) by Werner Schroeter
Fitzcarraldo by Werner Herzog
Hammett by Wim Wenders
Identification of a Woman (Identificazione di una donna) by Michelangelo Antonioni
A Ilha dos Amores by Paulo Rocha
Invitation au voyage by Peter Del Monte
Missing by Costa Gavras
Moonlighting by Jerzy Skolimowski
The Night of the Shooting Stars (La Notte di San Lorenzo) by Paolo and Vittorio Taviani
Passion by Jean-Luc Godard
The Return of the Soldier by Alan Bridges
Sandstorm (Vent de sable) by Mohammed Lakhdar-Hamina
Shoot the Moon by Alan Parker
Smithereens by Susan Seidelman
Sweet Inquest on Violence (Douce enquête sur la violence) by Gérard Guérin
That Night in Varennes (La Nuit de Varennes) by Ettore Scola
The True Story of Ah Q (Ah Q zheng zhuan) by Fan Cen
Yol by Şerif Gören and Yılmaz Güney

Un Certain Regard
The following films were selected for the competition of Un Certain Regard:

 Elia Kazan Outsider by Annie Tresgot
 Elippathayam by Adoor Gopalakrishnan
 Five and the Skin (Cinq et la peau) by Pierre Rissient
 Forty Deuce by Paul Morrissey
 A Girl's Tears (O lacrima de fata) by Iosif Demian
 Heart and Guts (Das Tripas Coração) by Ana Carolina
 A Letter to Freddy Buache (Lettre à Freddy Buache) by Jean-Luc Godard
 Little Wars (Les petites guerres) by Maroun Bagdadi
 Monkey Grip by Ken Cameron
 Roza by Hristoforos Hristofis
 See You in the Next War (Nasvidenje v naslednji vojni) by Živojin Pavlović
 Tree of Knowledge (Kundskabens træ) by Nils Malmros
 The Wind (Finye) by Souleymane Cissé
 Une villa aux environs de New York by Benoît Jacquot

Films out of competition
The following films were selected to be screened out of competition:

 Bonjour Mr. Lewis by Robert Benayoun
 Brel by Frédéric Rossif
 Chronopolis by Piotr Kamler
 Creepshow by George A. Romero
 E.T. the Extra-Terrestrial by Steven Spielberg
 The Evil Dead by Sam Raimi
 Intolerance by D. W. Griffith
 The Mystery of Picasso (Le mystère Picasso) by Henri-Georges Clouzot
 Parsifal by Hans-Jürgen Syberberg
 Pink Floyd – The Wall by Alan Parker

Short film competition
The following short films competed for the Short Film Palme d'Or:

Bumerang by Zsuzsanna Zsáky
The Cooler by Lol Creme and Kevin Godley
Elsa by Marja Pensala
Meow by Marcos Magalhães
Merlin ou le cours de l'or by Arthur Joffé
Sans préavis by Michel Gauthier
Szarnyaslenyek boltja by Laszlo Halmai
Ted Baryluk's Grocery by John Paskievich, Mike Mirus

Parallel sections

International Critics' Week
The following feature films were screened for the 21st International Critics' Week (21e Semaine de la Critique):

The Angel by Patrick Bokanowski (France)
Czułe miejsca (Des points sensibles) by Piotr Andrejew (Poland)
Dhil al ardh (L’Ombre de la terre) by Taieb Louhichi (Tunisia, France)
Half a Life (Mourir à trente ans) by Romain Goupil (France)
Jom by Ababacar Samb-Makharam (Senegal)
The Painter by Güran Du Rees and Christina Olofson (Sweden)
Parti sans laisser d'adresse by Jacqueline Veuve (Switzerland)

Directors' Fortnight
The following films were screened for the 1982 Directors' Fortnight (Quinzaine des Réalizateurs):

 Arais Min Kassab by Jillali Ferhati
 At by Ali Ozgentürk
 Batch '81 by Mike De Leon
 Bolivar, Sinfonia Tropical by Diego Risquez
 Daimler-Benz Limousine (Limuzyna Daimler-Benz) by Filip Bajon
 Dakhal by Goutam Ghose
 Falensterul by Savel Stiopul
 La Familia Orozco by Jorge Reyes
 Heatwave by Philip Noyce
 India, Daughter of the Sun (India, A Filha do Sol) by Fabio Barreto
 Kaliyugaya by Lester James Peries
 Kisapmata by Mike De Leon
 Les Papiers d’Aspern by Eduardo de Gregorio
 The Scarecrow by Sam Pillsbury
 Sekka Tomurai Zashi by Yoichi Takabayashi
 The Story Of Woo Viet by Ann Hui
 Time Stands Still (Megáll az idő) by Peter Gothar
 Too Far to Go by Fielder Cook
 La vela incantata by Gianfranco Mingozzi
 Wild Flowers (Les fleurs sauvages) by Jean Pierre Lefebvre

Short films

 Bogus by Ghislain Honoré, Jacques Lizzi
 Carry On Britannia by Stuart Rumens
 Coeurs Marins by Carlos Pedro de Andrade Jr
 Faces by (director not stated)
 Gratia Plena by (director not stated)
 Sopa de Pollo de Mama by Carlos Castillo

Awards

Official awards
The following films and people received the 1982 Official selection awards:
Palme d'Or:
Missing by Costa Gavras
Yol by Şerif Gören and Yılmaz Güney
Grand Prix: The Night of the Shooting Stars (La Notte di San Lorenzo) by Paolo and Vittorio Taviani
Best Director: Werner Herzog for Fitzcarraldo
Best Screenplay: Jerzy Skolimowski for Moonlighting
Best Actress: Jadwiga Jankowska-Cieślak for Another Way (Egymásra nézve)
Best Actor: Jack Lemmon for Missing
Best Artistic Contribution: Bruno Nuytten (cinematographer) for Invitation au voyage
35th Anniversary Prize: Identificazione di una donna by Michelangelo Antonioni
Golden Camera
Caméra d'Or: Half a Life by Romain Goupil
Short films
Short Film Palme d'Or: Merlin ou le cours de l'or by Arthur Joffé
 Jury Prize: Meow by Marcos Magalhães

Independent awards
FIPRESCI Prizes
Yol by Şerif Gören and Yilmaz Güney (Unanimously)
Another Way by Károly Makk (special award)
Wild Flowers (Les fleurs sauvages) by Jean Pierre Lefebvre (Directors' Fortnight)
Commission Supérieure Technique
Technical Grand Prize: Raoul Coutard (cinematographer) for Passion
Ecumenical Jury
 Prize of the Ecumenical Jury: The Night of the Shooting Stars (La Notte di San Lorenzo) by Paolo and Vittorio Taviani
 Ecumenical Jury - Special Mention: Dhil al ardh by Taieb Louhichi & Yol by Şerif Gören and Yilmaz Güney
Award of the Youth
Foreign Film: Time Stands Still by Péter Gothár
French Film: Half a Life by Romain Goupil
Other awards
Honorary Award: "Hommage à Satyajit Ray"

References

Media
INA: Opening ceremony of the 1982 Festival (commentary in French)

External links 
1982 Cannes Film Festival (web.archive)
Official website Retrospective 1982
Cannes Film Festival Awards for 1982 at Internet Movie Database

Cannes Film Festival
Cannes Film Festival
Cannes Film Festival
Cannes